HMS Rochester (L50) was a Shoreham-class sloop of the Royal Navy. She served during the Second World War  and was a successful anti-submarine warfare vessel, being credited with the destruction of five U-boats.

Construction
Rochester was ordered on 4 December 1929 under the 1929 Building Programme from HM Dockyard at Chatham, Kent.
She was laid down on 24 November 1930, launched 16 July 1931, and completed 24 March 1932. Designed as a general-purpose vessel, Rochester served on the South Atlantic and East Indies stations on patrol and contraband control until the outbreak of hostilities in September 1939.

Rochester underwent several modifications while in service; in winter 1939 she refitted as a convoy escort. 
In June 1941 she received Type 271 radar. In May 1942 she was equipped with Type 291 air defence radar and HF/DF.

Service history
At the outbreak of the Second World War Rochester returned to the UK for refitting, and in March 1940 was deployed to convoy escort in the Western Approaches.

After a further refit in summer 1940, after which her pennant number was changed to U50 Rochester returned to the North Atlantic.

In May 1941, while escorting convoy OB 318 with 7th Escort Group, Rochester and two others attacked and damaged , forcing her to break off the attack and retire.

After a further  refit Rochester was assigned to 37 EG, deployed as convoy escort on the Gibraltar and South  Atlantic routes. 
In February 1942, with 43 EG escorting convoy OS 18, Rochester and corvette Tamarisk intercepted  in transit from US East Coast and destroyed her.

In the autumn of 1942 Rochester was part of the naval force for Operation Torch.

In October 1943 Rochester and 39 EG, escorting convoy SL 138/MKS 28, were involved in a five-day battle with Schill U-boat group resulting in the loss of one ship sunk and one U-boat destroyed.

In summer 1944 Rochester was involved in Operation Neptune, the naval component of the Normandy landings. In June 1944 she was in action with a U-boat in the English Channel. The U-boat (possibly ) escaped, though corvette Pink was damaged.

In November 1944 Rochester went for final refit, decommissioning as an escort vessel and re-equipping as a training ship.

In September 1949 Rochester was decommissioned for the final time and in January 1951 was sold for scrap.

Battle Honours
During her service Rochester was awarded three battle honours.
Atlantic 1939-45
North Africa 1942 
Normandy 1944

Successes
During her service Rochester was credited with the destruction of five U-boats:

Notes

References
 Blair, Clay. Hitler’s U-Boat War Vol I  (1996). 
 Blair, Clay. Hitler's U-Boat War Vol II (1998). 
 

 
Kemp, Paul. U-Boats Destroyed  (1997) 
 
Neistle, Axel. German U-Boat Losses during World War II  (1998). 
 
Warlow, Ben. Battle Honours of the Royal Navy (2004)

External links

HMS Rochester at navalhistory.net
 HMS Rochester at uboat.net

 

Shoreham-class sloops
1932 ships
World War II sloops of the United Kingdom
Sloops of the Royal Navy